Billy "The Texan" Longley (192627 March 2014) was an underworld figure best known as a standover man on the Melbourne waterfront during the 1960s and 1970s.

Biography 
On 21 June 1958, he married Patricia Alma who had been previously married to another Painter and Docker member, Harry Heffernan.    

On the night of 6 January 1961, Longley got into an altercation with his father-in-law; Hector McGowran, known as "Johnny Diamond" at Longley's home in Richmond, Victoria over a gun Longley found. During the altercation, the gun went off and hit Patricia, killing her. On 10 June 1961, Longley was convicted of manslaughter and was sentenced to nine years, he appealed against sentence and was granted a new trial in February 1962 and was acquitted in October of that year.    

In 1971, he was nominated for President of the Victorian branch of the Painters and Dockers Union but lost the election to Arthur Morris in controversial circumstances.    

In 1973, Longley was charged and convicted of the murder of Pat Shannon, then Secretary of the Painters and Dockers Union, and was sentenced to life imprisonment in 1975. He served 13 years in prison for this, maintaining his innocence. While in prison, he made a number of allegations regarding union corruption that led to the establishment of the Costigan Royal Commission.

Longley later moved to Moonee Ponds and died in the Royal Melbourne Hospital on the morning of 27 March 2014.

Nickname 
Longley was given the moniker "The Texan" from a television western about a man named Bill Longley with a similar liking for Colt .45 pistols.

See also
 Jack "Putty Nose" Nicholls

References

External links
 2004 YouTube interview with Billy Longley; accessed 28 March 2014.
 Organised crime, emelbourne.net.au; accessed 28 March 2014.
 "The Texan" dies as the last man standing, newshour24.com; accessed 28 March 2014.
 Underworld figure Billy ‘The Texan’ Longley farewelled at funeral

1926 births
2014 deaths
Criminals from Melbourne
Date of birth missing
Australian people convicted of murder
Australian waterside workers